A taxicab stand (also called taxi rank, cab stand, taxi stand, cab rank, or hack stand) is a queue area on a street or on private property where taxicabs line up to wait for passengers.

Operation

Stands are normally located at high-traffic locations such as airports, hotel driveways, railway stations, subway stations, bus depots, ferry terminals, shopping centres, and major street intersections. Usually stands are marked by simple painted signs.  

Stands generally work as a first-come, first-served queue, so that the first taxicab to arrive on the stand (the one at the front of the line) serves the first passenger to arrive, and as the first taxicab leaves, each taxicab behind it moves ahead one spot, with the last taxicab to arrive taking the last spot.

In the Republic of Ireland an intending passenger is entitled to choose any taxicab that is available for hire at an appointed taxi stand. The Commission for Taxi Regulation has deemed that the customer has the right to choose and that the principle of first come, first served is dismissed.

Around the world

In some cities, such as London and New York, some older taxi stands are marked by special lamps with "TAXI" painted on the sides of them.

Some major stands are divided into separate queues.  For example, at the Nagoya railway station in Japan, small- and large-capacity taxis line up separately; while at Shanghai Hongqiao International Airport in Shanghai, short- and long-distance taxis use separate queues. In Hong Kong, different kinds of taxis line up separately, as some of their service areas overlap.

Recharging
Taxicab stands can be used to recharge batteries of electric taxis.

See also

 Charging station
 Electric vehicle

Sources

References

Taxis
Stations, terminals and stops
Charging stations
Street furniture